Sandy Lake is a lake in Alberta. The lake is situated 55 km northwest of Edmonton in the County of Lac Ste. Anne and the Municipal District of Sturgeon. It is located near Morinville. Sandy Beach, Sunrise Beach, Pine Sands, the Sandy Lake Wilderness Area and the Alexander Indian Reserve are all situated on the lake's shoreline. Sportfish include Yellow Perch and Northern Pike. Alberta Highway 642 crosses the lake.

References 

Lac Ste. Anne County
Sandy Lake
Sturgeon County